Athrips is a genus of moths in the family Gelechiidae.

Species
tigrina species-group
Athrips tigrina (Christoph, 1877)
nitrariella species-group
Athrips bidilatata Li & Zheng, 1998
Athrips maculata Bidzilya & Li, 2009
Athrips mongolorum Piskunov, 1980
Athrips neimongolica Bidzilya & Li, 2009
Athrips nitrariella (Chrétien, 1908)
gussakovskii species-group
Athrips autumnella Falkovitsh & Bidzilya, 2003
Athrips carthaginella (Lucas, 1940)
Athrips gussakovskii (Gerasimov, 1930)
thymifoliella species-group
Athrips thymifoliella (Constant, 1893)
nigricostella species-group
Athrips amoenella (Frey, 1882)
Athrips kerzhneri Piskunov, 1990
Athrips nigricostella (Duponchel, 1842)
Athrips rutjani Bidzilya, 2005
Athrips stepposa Bidzilya, 2005
Athrips tetrapunctella (Thunberg, 1794)
falkovitshi species-group
Athrips falkovitshi Piskunov, 1990
fagoniae species-group
Athrips fagoniae (Walsingham, 1904)
gerasimovi species-group
Athrips gerasimovi Piskunov, 1982
septempunctata species-group
Athrips peteri Bidzilya, 2005
Athrips septempunctata Li & Zheng, 1998
Athrips tcharyna Bidzilya, 2005
tsaidamica species-group
Athrips tsaidamica Emelyanov & Piskunov, 1982
pruinosella species-group
Athrips adumbratella (Snellen, 1884)
Athrips eugenii Bidzilya, 2005
Athrips gansuensis Bidzilya & Li, 2009
Athrips huangshana Bidzilya & Li, 2009
Athrips kostjuki Bidzilya, 2005
Athrips medjella (Chretien, 1900)
Athrips montana Bidzilya & Li, 2009
Athrips mouffetella (Linnaeus, 1758)
Athrips nigristriata Bidzilya & Li, 2009
Athrips nigrogrisea (Kolmakova, 1958)
Athrips patockai (Povolny, 1979)
Athrips polymaculella Park, 1991
Athrips pruinosella (Lienig & Zeller, 1846)
Athrips rancidella (Herrich-Schaffer, 1854)
Athrips ravida Bidzilya & Li, 2009
Athrips sibirica Bidzilya, 2005
Athrips spiraeae (Staudinger, 1871)
Unnplaced to species-group
Athrips albibasella Bidzilya, 2010
Athrips albicostella Bidzilya, 2010
Athrips angustisaccula Bidzilya, 2010
Athrips aquila Junnilainen, 2010
Athrips asarinella (Chretien, 1930)
Athrips bruneosparsa (Janse, 1958)
Athrips bidzilyai Junnilainen, 2010
Athrips cretulata (Meyrick, 1927)
Athrips dorsimaculata Bidzilya, 2010
Athrips flavida Bidzilya, 2010
Athrips helicaula (Meyrick, 1912)
Athrips hirtopalpa Bidzilya, 2010
Athrips irritans (Povolný, 1989)
Athrips latipalpella Bidzilya, 2010
Athrips mappigera (Meyrick, 1914)
Athrips meyi Bidzilya, 2010
Athrips neograpta (Meyrick, 1914)
Athrips nigrinervosa Bidzilya, 2010
Athrips pallida Bidzilya, 2010
Athrips phaeomicta (Meyrick, 1936)
Athrips phoenaula (Meyrick, 1913)
Athrips profusa (Meyrick, 1921)
Athrips ptychophora (Meyrick, 1914)
Athrips punctosa Bidzilya, 2010
Athrips ravidinigra Bidzilya, 2010
Athrips sisterina (Povolný, 1989)
Athrips studiosa (Meyrick, 1905)
Athrips syncopaula (Meyrick, 1937)
Athrips telifera (Meyrick, 1910)
Athrips zetterstedtiella (Zeller, 1852)
Athrips zophochalca (Meyrick, 1918)

References

 , 2005: A review of the genus Athrips (Lepidoptera: Gelechiidae) in the Palaearctic region . Deutsche Entomologische Zeitschrift 52 (1): 3-71. 
 , 2009: A review of the genus Athrips Billberg (Lepidoptera: Gelechiidae), in China. Deutsche Entomologische Zeitschrift 56 (2): 323-333. . 
 , 2010: A taxonomic review of the genera Parapsectris Meyrick, 1911 and Athrips Billberg, 1820 in Africa. Esperiana Memoir 5: 341-408.
 , 2010: The gelechiid fauna of the southern Ural Mountains, part I: descriptions of seventeen new species (Lepidoptera: Gelechiidae). Zootaxa 2366: 1-34. Abstract: http://www.mapress.com/zootaxa/2010/f/z02366p034f.pdf].

 
Gelechiini
Moth genera